Brian James Johnson "Johnno" (26 June 1956 – 12 January 2016) was an Australian professional rugby league footballer who played as a  in the 1970s and 1980s, and coached in the 1980s and 1990s. He played in Sydney for the St George Dragons and Eastern Suburbs clubs, and in England for Warrington.

Playing career
A Dapto junior, Johnson's only representative appearance was for Country New South Wales in 1978.

St. George Dragons
He started his Sydney career at St. George Dragons in 1979, and played . He played six first grade seasons at St. George Dragons and was a crowd favourite at Kogarah Oval and played over 140 games. He won a Premiership in his first year at the Dragons in 1979.

His last year in the Sydney premiership was 1986 and Johnson joined Eastern Suburbs for one season, then moved to England and joined Warrington. He had three seasons at Warrington and scored 48 tries with the club, winning the Premiership Final in his first season.

County Cup Final appearances
Johnson played , and scored a try in Warrington's 8-34 defeat by Wigan in the 1985 Lancashire Cup Final during the 1985–86 season at Knowsley Road, St Helens, on Sunday 13 October 1985, and played  in the 16-28 defeat by Wigan in the 1987 Lancashire Cup Final during the 1987–88 season at Knowsley Road, St. Helens on Sunday 11 October 1987.

John Player Special Trophy Final appearances
Johnson played  in Warrington's 4-18 defeat by Wigan in the 1986–87 John Player Special Trophy Final during the 1986–87 season at Burnden Park, Bolton on Saturday 10 January 1987.

Coaching
In 1988-89 season Johnson became head coach at Warrington. He guided the team to the Lancashire Cup victory in 1989. Brian Johnson was the coach in Warrington's 14-36 defeat by Wigan in the 1990 Challenge Cup Final during the 1989–90 season at Wembley Stadium, London on Saturday 28 April 1990, in front of a crowd of 77,729. Under Johnson, Warrington also won the Regal Trophy in 1990-91 season. In 1993–94 season Warrington finished third in the league on points difference behind Wigan and Bradford Northern. The following season Warrington made the Regal Trophy Final once more, again losing to Wigan. He resigned from his position in January 1996 in the Rugby League Centenary Season following a club record 80–0 defeat against St. Helens at Knowsley Road. Johnson was later employed by the AIS as a rugby league coach.

Death
Johnson died from Alzheimer's Disease on 12 January 2016. He was survived by his wife and two sons.

References

1956 births
2016 deaths
Australian Institute of Sport coaches
Australian rugby league coaches
Australian rugby league players
Country New South Wales rugby league team players
Deaths from dementia in Australia
Deaths from Alzheimer's disease
Rugby league fullbacks
St. George Dragons players
Sydney Roosters players
Warrington Wolves coaches
Warrington Wolves players